The 1911 Birmingham South by-election was held on 3 May 1911.  The by-election was held due to the incumbent Liberal Unionist MP, Charles Howard, becoming the tenth Earl of Carlisle.  It was won by the Liberal Unionist candidate (who quickly became a Conservative) Leo Amery, who was unopposed.

References

Birmingham South by-election
Birmingham South by-election
1910s in Birmingham, West Midlands
Birmingham South by-election
South, 1911
Unopposed by-elections to the Parliament of the United Kingdom (need citation)